Dooby Dooby Moo is a children's book written by Doreen Cronin and illustrated by Betsy Lewin.  Released in 2006 by Atheneum Books, it continues the story of Farmer Brown's animals from Click, Clack, Moo: Cows That Type, who enter a talent show in an attempt to win a trampoline. The book has been adapted to a play and a 2007 13-minute animated short film narrated by Randy Travis and produced by Weston Woods Studio.

Reception
Kirkus Reviews described the book as "great fun". humanities360.com said there's a "wild unpredictability [in the] drawings". lookingglassreview.com said the book is "sure to become a firm favorite".

See also

Click, Clack, Moo
Giggle, Giggle, Quack
Duck for President

References

American picture books
2006 children's books
Children's fiction books
Fictional cattle
Atheneum Books books